Julian Union High School (commonly known as Julian High School), is a public 4-year high school located in Julian, California. It is part of the Julian Union High School District.

The federal New Deal Works Projects Administration was involved in the construction of the school, athletic field, bleachers,  and surrounding rubble wall according to a bronze plaque at the entrance of the campus and date stamps in the concrete of the bleachers. Year of construction was 1940.

See also 
List of high schools in San Diego County, California
List of school districts in San Diego County, California

References

External links 

 

High schools in San Diego County, California
1940 establishments in California